Strangeways is a surname. Notable people with the surname include:

 David Strangeways, British officer involved with allied deceptions during World War II
 James Strangeways, English politician of the 15th century
 Thomas Strangeways, British physician and founder of Strangeways Research Laboratory

Fictional characters
 Nigel Strangeways, a fictional detective in works of Cecil Day-Lewis writing as Nicholas Blake